Qiongri'asang (Chinese: 窮日阿桑, Tibetan: ཆིཨོང་རི་ཨ་སང་) is a ghost town in the Tibet Autonomous Region of China. The town has not been populated since before 2010. To its north, it borders the Longren (陇仁) grazing area, and to its east, its borders the Suorikabao Dijiari’ai (索日卡保蒂加日埃) grazing area.

See also
List of towns and villages in Tibet

References 

Geography of Tibet
Ghost towns in China